Now Hear This is an album by the American pianist Hal Galper. It was released on the Enja label in 1977.

Critical reception

The AllMusic review by Ken Dryden states: "Hal Galper has long been an underrated composer and pianist. This Enja release from 1977 finds him at the top of his game in both roles." In 2010, when reviewing the CD reissue, he said, "This is easily one of Galper's best recordings of the 1970s." The San Francisco Examiner called Now Hear This "a very strong album," and praised "Cecil McBee's driving bass and the brilliant drumming of Tony Williams."

Track listing
All compositions by Hal Galper unless noted.
 "Now Hear This" - 8:19
 "Shadow Waltz" - 6:11
 "Mr. Fixit" - 5:02
 "First Song in the Day" - 9:02
 "Bemsha Swing" (Thelonious Monk, Denzil Best) - 6:09
 "Red Eye Special" - 5:32
 "First Song in the Day" [alternate take] - 7:32 Bonus track on CD reissue

Personnel
Hal Galper - piano
Terumasa Hino - trumpet
Cecil McBee - double bass
Tony Williams - drums

References

Enja Records albums
Hal Galper albums
1977 albums